Nitella syncarpa is a species of stonewort belonging to the family Characeae.

Synonym:
 Chara syncarpa Thuillier (= basionym)

References

Charophyta